Arefino is a rural locality (a village) in Kupriyanovskoye Rural Settlement, Gorokhovetsky District, Vladimir Oblast, Russia. The population was 401 as of 2010. There are 4 streets.

Geography 
Arefino is located 19 km southwest of Gorokhovets (the district's administrative centre) by road. Knyazhichi is the nearest rural locality.

References 

Rural localities in Gorokhovetsky District